Rwamwanja Secondary School  is located on Kyenjojo-Kahunge road  from Kahunge trading centre located on the Kamwenge-Fortportal road. The school is an O level mixed day school. The headteacher is Mr. Ntwatwa Oscar

Educational institutions with year of establishment missing
Schools in Uganda